Tumar Darrahsi-ye Olya (also Romanized as Ţūmār Darrahsī-ye ‘Olyā; also known as Tūmār Darrehsī-ye Bālā) is a village in Arshaq-e Gharbi Rural District, Moradlu District, Meshgin Shahr County, Ardabil Province, Iran. At the 2006 census, its population was 27, in 6 families.

References 

Towns and villages in Meshgin Shahr County